Viseisei is a village at Vuda Point on the west coast of Viti Levu island, in Ba Province of Fiji.

History
According to tradition, it is the oldest settlement in Fiji, established by Lutunasobasoba when the first Melanesian canoes beached at Vuda Point.

Fiji's former President, Ratu Josefa Iloilo, who held the chiefly title of Tui Vuda, hailed from Viseisei. Ratu Iloilo died on 6 February 2011 at the age of 90.

References

Ba Province
Populated places in Fiji